Skøyen is a light rail station on the Oslo Tramway. It is served by Line 13. It is located between Thune and Hoff.

Located at Skøyen, it was opened by Kristiania Elektriske Sporvei as an extension of the Skøyen Line on 21 June 1903. In 1919, it also became the first station on the Lilleaker Line. It is served by line 13. The two stations are not adjacent, but within easy walking distance.

References

Oslo Tramway stations in Oslo
Railway stations opened in 1903
1903 establishments in Norway